Arenophryne xiphorhyncha, the southern sandhill frog, is a fossorial anuran found in a limited range of far western Australia. The only congener to A. xiphorhynca is the northern sandhill frog, Arenophryne rotunda, which was considered the sole species within the genus Arenophryne until  this species was discovered about 100 kilometres from Geraldton, Western Australia, in Kalbarri National Park.

References

Myobatrachidae
Endemic fauna of Australia
Amphibians of Western Australia
Amphibians described in 2008
Frogs of Australia